Protein sprouty homolog 3 is a protein that in humans is encoded by the SPRY3 gene.

The SPRY3 gene is one of the genes found in the pseudoautosomal regions of the human sex chromosomes (i.e. those 19 genes that are found on both the X and Y chromosome). It is located in the PAR2 region.

References

Further reading

External links
 
 

SPR domain
Human proteins